This is a list of islands of East Timor.

List

See also
 Geography of East Timor
 List of islands of Indonesia

References

 
East Timor
East Timor geography-related lists